Mud Creek is a stream in the Randolph and Monroe counties of north central Missouri. It is a tributary of Middle Fork Salt River. The stream headwaters are in Northeast Randolph County just northeast of Cairo and U. S. Route 63. The stream flows northeast then turns southeast as it passes Levicks Mill. The stream turns east as it enters Monroe County just to the northwest of Ash. The stream meanders eastward passing under Missouri Route 151 reaching its confluence with the Middle Fork of the Salt River about three miles northwest of Holiday.

Mud Creek was so named on account of muddy banks.

See also
List of rivers of Missouri

References

Rivers of Monroe County, Missouri
Rivers of Randolph County, Missouri
Rivers of Missouri